Trace Elliot is a United Kingdom-based bass amplification manufacturer, and has a sub-brand, Trace Acoustic, for acoustic instruments.

History 

In 1979, a music shop in Romford, Essex, UK, called Soundwave was building and hiring out PA systems to local musicians.  It soon became apparent that some of this equipment was not being used simply as PA but instead was being used by bass players, who for so long had to put up with under-powered amplification that was often merely a guitar amplifier with a modified tone circuit.

The Soundwave owner, Fred Friedlein, and staff which included Alan Morgan (sales) and Stuart Watson (design engineer) realised the potential market and developed a range of products that incorporated MOSFET output stages driving large cabinets, including 15” drivers, and also the world's first bass-dedicated 4 x 10” cabinet, now an industry standard for all bass amp lines.

There were several features which made this product unique: the  GP11 pre-amp featured 11 graphic EQ bands which were very broad bands, overlapping each other, thereby enabling massive amounts of frequency cut or boost when adjacent bands were boosted or cut. Secondly, the frequency bands were spaced closer together towards the bass end allowing even more variation for bass guitarists to alter their sound like no other amp had previously allowed. Added to this were MOSFET poweramps of 250 or 500 watts and the option of bi-amplified systems where bass and upper frequencies are filtered before being separately amplified and fed to dedicated high frequency and low frequency speaker cabinets. Trace Elliot, as the brand came to be called, gained a reputation for themselves; rumour has it that early users were John Paul Jones of Led Zeppelin, Andy Rourke of The Smiths and Brian Helicopter of punk band The Shapes. Mark King of Level 42 was also an early adopter of the brand. The company, now dedicated to manufacturing, moved to new premises in Witham, Essex, in 1985 to satisfy the growing demand.

In late 1986, Stuart Watson, technical director and designer of the Trace Elliot range up to the Mark 5 series, left the company. That same year Fred Friedlein (then sole owner of Trace Elliot) employed the services of freelance electronics designer Clive Button. In 1986 Mark Gooday was appointed MD and given 24% of the company by Friedlein in thanks for the growth and production changes made by Gooday.

In 1989, Trace Elliot introduced the Trace Acoustic range of acoustic amplifiers, whose features were developed by Friedlein, Gooday, Clive Roberts and Clive Button. The company moved again from its base on Witham, this time to Maldon, Essex.

In 1992 the company was bought by Kaman, which had previously handled the brand's US distribution. The reason for the sale was the need for growth and the importance of the US market. Kaman staff would service a brand but would not grow brands unless they owned them. This arrangement was suggested to Friedlein by Gooday (to whom Friedlein had offered the full company at a very low price). The sale to Kaman meant Friedlein could retire and Gooday could see the brand grow with Kaman.

Kaman downsized their music division in 1997 and sold the company to a trio of Trace Elliot directors, who took ownership of a brand with nearly 200 staff on a  site; they focused on exploiting the North American market, and in 1998 sold the company to the Gibson Guitar Corporation.

In January 2002, the factory was closed and all the staff were laid off. Gibson moved the production of a few particular products they wanted to continue with to various locations in the United States.

In April 2005 it was announced that Peavey Electronics had acquired the North American distribution rights to the Trace Elliot brand.

Notable products, past and present
GP11 pre-amplifier, very collectable unit combined with various power amp models produced in the 1980s. 
1110 Combo, a combination amplifier/speaker unit comprising a GP11 pre-amplifier, V5 mosfet amplifier and  4 x 10” bass cabinet.
1048H Successor to the world's first dedicated 4 x 10” bass cabinet.
BLX-80 a compact 80 watt bass combo with an innovative back-of-cabinet mounted 10" speaker and a full-featured GP7 pre-amp section. The name was derived from the phrase "the dog's bollocks" which was used to describe the combo during development.
AH1000-12 Fully featured bass head with 12 Band EQ, Valve Drive, dual band compression and many other features.
Trace Acoustic range. Numerous models for amplifying acoustic instruments.
GP12SMX Bass Preamp: 12 Band EQ Bass Pre-amp. The basis for the preamp in all the SMX series.
V-Type V6 300 W all valve head. Used by many Britpop bands in the '90s. 
V-Type V8 400 W all valve head, with overdrive and compression on board.
Velocette: 1990s-era 15 W valve-powered guitar combos; several variants, basis for the Gibson Goldtone range.

References

External links
Company website

Guitar amplifier manufacturers
Audio equipment manufacturers of  the United Kingdom